"Seeya" is a song by Canadian electronic music producer Deadmau5 featuring vocals by American singer Colleen D'Agostino from the punk rock band The Material. It was released as the second single from his seventh studio album While(1<2) on 27 May 2014. The track is also an updated revision of an unreleased instrumental by Deadmau5, titled "Seeya Next Tuesday".

Track listing

Charts

Weekly charts

Year-end charts

Certifications

References

2014 singles
2014 songs
Deadmau5 songs
Songs written by Deadmau5
Astralwerks singles